Lajos Vető (1904–1989) was a Hungarian Lutheran bishop sympathetic to the communist leadership. The communist government replaced Bishop Lajos Ordass as head of Hungary's Lutherans with Lajos Vető following Ordnass' "anti-communist address" at the International Lutheran assembly in Minneapolis. Lajos Vető resigned his position after the Hungarian revolt, but returned to post in December 1957.

References

1904 births
1989 deaths
People from Békés County
People from the Kingdom of Hungary
Hungarian Lutheran clergy
Members of the National Assembly of Hungary (1953–1958)
Members of the National Assembly of Hungary (1958–1963)
Members of the National Assembly of Hungary (1963–1967)
Members of the National Assembly of Hungary (1967–1971)